Acacia cockertoniana is a tree belonging to the genus Acacia and the subgenus Juliflorae. It is native to the Mid West and Goldfields-Esperance regions of Western Australia.

Description

See also
List of Acacia species

References

cockertoniana
Acacias of Western Australia
Plants described in 2007
Taxa named by Bruce Maslin